The Louiseville Jets were a Canadian semi-professional ice hockey team in Louiseville, Quebec. They played in the Quebec Semi-Pro Hockey League for the 1996–97 season, before folding.

External links
 The Internet Hockey Database

Ice hockey teams in Quebec
Louiseville
Quebec Semi-Pro Hockey League teams
Ice hockey clubs established in 1996
Sports clubs disestablished in 1997